Sandy Bay Road is a road in Tasmania that connects the southeastern edge of the Hobart CBD with the southeastern suburb of Taroona. It is two-way over its entirety and is 12 kilometres in length. It begins as a continuation of Harrington Street near where it intersects with Davey Street. From there, Sandy Bay Road travels southwards alongside the western edge of St. Davids Park, bypassing Battery Point. It then turns slightly to the west again, before descending a small hill towards the south-east once more, into Sandy Bay proper. Sand Bay Road then continues south-easterly, hugging the western shore of the River Derwent. Passing Wrest Point Hotel Casino it continues to the south-east along Sandy Bay Beach through Lower Sandy Bay. At the point where the Alexandra Battery overlooks Long Beach, Sandy Bay road follows the coast bending in a more southwards direction. The road then begins to climb uphill towards the suburb of Taroona where it becomes the Channel Highway. The road is allocated route code B68.

Sandy Bay Road was first established as a track in the colonial period, early in the nineteenth century. Early nineteenth century diagrams and art clearly show the track following along the western shore of the river heading south. It soon became a widened dirt road, before finally being bitumenised in the early twentieth century. During the period in which trams and trolley buses were operated in Hobart, tramlines and trolley-bus lines ran the length of Sandy Bay Road from the city as far as Lower Sandy Bay.

See also

References

Streets in Hobart